Lincoln Tech is an American group of for-profit postsecondary vocational institutions headquartered in Parsippany, New Jersey. Each campus is owned and operated by Lincoln Educational Services Corporation, a provider of career-oriented post-secondary education.

As of March 31, 2019, Lincoln had 10,680 students enrolled at 22 campuses.

Accreditation
Lincoln schools are accredited by the Accrediting Council for Independent Colleges and Schools (ACICS), Accrediting Commission of Career Schools and Colleges (ACCSC), and New England Association of Schools and Colleges – Commission on Institutions of Higher Education (NEASC)

In 2016, the US Department of Education stripped ACICS of its accreditation powers. However, on April 5, 2018, ACICS accreditation was restored by the DOE, pending further review (subsequently suspended in 2022). The following schools are ACICS accredited and are certified to operate according to the U.S. Department of Education: Somerville, MA; Iselin, Moorestown and Paramus, NJ; Las Vegas, NV; Lincoln, RI; and Marietta, GA.

History
The founder and first president of Lincoln was J. Warren Davies. The first Lincoln Technical Institute was established in 1946 in Newark, New Jersey, to serve World War II veterans returning from overseas.  At Lincoln, these veterans found training programs to help them learn career-specific skills, and transition into civilian careers in installation and servicing of air conditioning and refrigeration equipment. Automotive courses were added in 1948. Lincoln established traveling schools to offer NAPA-certified training, which certified over 11,000 mechanics between 1955 and 1965.

In 1969, Ryder acquired Lincoln Technical Institute and two other technical schools with campuses in Illinois, Pennsylvania, and New Jersey. By 1977, Lincoln Technical Institute had ten campuses in Illinois, Indiana, Iowa, Maryland, New Jersey, Pennsylvania, Texas, and Washington, D.C. Lincoln Technical Institute acquired court reporting school The Cittone Institute and its three campuses in 1994, leading the group to have 14 campuses by the school's 50th anniversary in 1996.

Stonington Partners and Hart Capital purchased Lincoln Technical Institute in 2000. The school continued expanding, acquiring Denver Automotive and Diesel College and Computer-Ed Business Institutes in 2001, Lincoln College of Technology in Nashville (previously the Nashville Auto-Diesel College) in 2003, and the Southwestern College of Business and New England Technical Institute in 2004.

Lincoln Educational Services Corporation made its initial public stock offering in 2005, trading on the NASDAQ under the symbol LINC.  California Regent Richard C. Blum (Dianne Feinstein's husband) was a key investor, with $24,000,000 in stock.

Also in 2005, the group acquired the Euphoria Institute of Beauty Arts and Sciences. Further acquisitions include the Harrison Career Institute in 2007, Briarwood College in December 2008 and the Baran Institute of Technology schools (Baran Institute of Technology, Connecticut Culinary Institute, Americare School of Nursing, Engine City Technical Institute, and Clemens College) in 2009. Lincoln completed the purchase of Florida Medical Training Institute in 2012 and abruptly closed all campuses in 2014 without a teach-out.

In 2014, The New York Times reported that 50% of all Lincoln schools failed proposed gainful employment regulations. Sixty of Lincoln Tech's programs had passing rates, thirteen had "zone" rates, and five programs failed. Of the failing programs three have been closed and the remaining two are being taught-out.

In 2018, the Lincoln College of New England campus in Southington, Connecticut was closed.

Campuses
Lincoln Educational Services operates through the following brands:  Lincoln Technical Institute, Lincoln College of Technology, Euphoria Institute of Beauty Arts and Sciences, and Lincoln Culinary Institute.

Headquarters: 200 Executive Drive, West Orange, NJ 07052 (Corporate Office – No classrooms at this location)
Lincoln Technical Institute:
New Britain, Connecticut
Shelton, Connecticut
Columbia, Maryland
Somerville, Massachusetts
Iselin, New Jersey
Mahwah, New Jersey
Moorestown, New Jersey
Paramus, New Jersey
South Plainfield, New Jersey
Union, New Jersey
Queens, New York City, New York
Allentown, Pennsylvania
Philadelphia, Pennsylvania 
Lincoln, Rhode Island

Lincoln College of Technology:
East Windsor, Connecticut
Denver, Colorado
Marietta, Georgia
Melrose Park, Illinois
Indianapolis, Indiana
Grand Prairie, Texas
Nashville, Tennessee (formerly Nashville Auto Diesel College)
Florence, Kentucky (No longer in service at this location) 
Lincoln Culinary Institute:
Shelton, Connecticut

Euphoria Institute of Beauty Arts and Sciences:
Las Vegas, Nevada

Closed locations
Lincoln College of New England: Southington, Connecticut (2018)

Programs
Lincoln Tech structures program offerings to provide students with a practical, career-oriented education and position for them for attractive entry-level job opportunities in their chosen fields. , Lincoln Tech offers training in five program verticals; Automotive, Health Sciences, Skilled Trades, Hospitality Services, and Business/I.T. Twelve campuses offer training in five automotive fields, eleven campuses offer training in nine healthcare fields, thirteen campuses offer training in five skilled trade fields, three campuses offer training in five hospitality service fields, and seven campuses offer training in 6 business/IT fields.

Lawsuits and investigations
Lincoln Educational Services faced an investor lawsuit on behalf of those who purchased company stock between March 3, 2010, and August 5, 2010. The plaintiffs alleged that Lincoln Educational Services issued a series of materially false and misleading statements related to its business and operations in violation of the Securities Exchange Act of 1934. The case was dismissed by the United States District Court for the District of New Jersey in September 2011.

In 2013, USA Today, based on data from 2009 to 2010, called one of the company's 31 campuses a "Red Flag school", one which has "a higher loan default rate than graduation rate."

In October 2014, Massachusetts state attorney general Martha Coakley announced an investigation into Lincoln's for-profit schools in the state of Massachusetts.

In 2015, Lincoln Educational Services agreed to repay approximately $1 million to graduates of its criminal justice program in Somerville and Lowell, Massachusetts. The Massachusetts' Attorney General found that students were unable to find work in their fields of study, and the company included unrelated jobs in its placement data. According to the Boston Globe, "The school also allegedly told recruiters to 'establish unhappiness, create urgency,' and 'bring out the pain' to pressure prospective students to attend the school instead of military or community college. The for-profit school instructed recruiters to contact students at least seven times within the first three days to convince them to enroll."

References

External links
 

1946 establishments in New Jersey
For-profit universities and colleges in the United States
Education companies established in 1946
Education companies of the United States
Two-year colleges in the United States
Private universities and colleges in Colorado
Private universities and colleges in New York (state)
Private universities and colleges in Ohio
Private universities and colleges in Tennessee
Private universities and colleges in Connecticut
Private universities and colleges in Georgia (U.S. state)
Universities and colleges in Hartford County, Connecticut
Universities and colleges in Howard County, Maryland
Private universities and colleges in Illinois
Private universities and colleges in Indiana
Private universities and colleges in Maryland
Private universities and colleges in Massachusetts
Private universities and colleges in Nevada
Private universities and colleges in New Jersey
Private universities and colleges in Pennsylvania
Private universities and colleges in Rhode Island
Buildings and structures in Lincoln, Rhode Island
Education in Providence County, Rhode Island
Companies based in Essex County, New Jersey
Educational institutions established in 1946
West Orange, New Jersey